Torrents of Steel is a 1967 Soviet war drama film directed by Efim Dzigan based on the eponymous story by Alexander Serafimovich.

Plot
The plot is based on a heavy campaign by the Taman Army through the areas occupied by the White Army. The film is set during the summer of 1918, the beginning of the Russian Civil War.

Cast
Nikolay Alekseev - Kozhukh, commander of the Taman army
Lev Fritschinsky - Artemov, regiment
Vladimir Ivashov - Alexei Prikhodko
Nikolay Dupak - Volosatov, regiment
Nikolay Denisenko - The Barefooted
Anatoly Degtyar - Opanasov
Yakov Gladkikh - Smirnyuk
G. Zaslawiec - Golovan
Irina Murzaeva - Gorpina (voiced by Valentina Vladimirova)
Nina Alisova - Claudia
Leonid Gallis - General Anton Denikin
Vladimir Sedov - General Viktor Pokrovsky
Nikolay Zaseev-Rudenko - adjutant of General Pokrovsky
Nikolay Trofimov - soldier Chirik
Boris Bityukov - Red Commander
Valentin Golubenko - Smolokurov
Arkady Shcherbakov
Akaki Kvantaliani - dukhan
Ksenia Kozmina - Stepanida
Valery Skorobogatov - Bratkin
Sergey (Max) Maximov - soldier
Yuri Volkov - Colonel
Leon Kukulian
Galina Samokhina
Maria Saharchuk
Mikhail Semenikhin
Georgios Sovcis

References

External links

Soviet war drama films
1960s war drama films
Mosfilm films
Russian Civil War films
1967 drama films
1967 films